Puerto Rico Senatorial District II, also known as the Senatorial District of Bayamón, is one of the eight senatorial districts of Puerto Rico. It is currently represented by Migdalia Padilla and Carmelo Ríos Santiago (both from the New Progressive Party).

District profile

The Senatorial District II covers the municipalities of Bayamón, Cataño, Toa Alta, Toa Baja, and some regions of Guaynabo. It has an approximate population of 459,805.

In previous distributions, the territory covered by the Senatorial District II has changed. Originally, the District included both Toa Alta and Toa Baja, but in the 1991 redistribution, Toa Alta was assigned to the District of Arecibo.

In the 2002 redistribution, Toa Alta was reassigned to the District, but some regions of Guaynabo were assigned to the District of San Juan.

Election results

2012

|-
! style="background-color:#0080FF" |
| style="width: 130px" | New Progressive Party (PNP)
|               | Migdalia Padilla
| style="text-align:right;"|106,133
|  style="text-align:right;"|25.73
| style="text-align:right;"| -2.31
|-
! style="background-color:#0080FF" |
| style="width: 130px" | New Progressive Party (PNP)
|               | Carmelo Ríos Santiago
| style="text-align:right;"|106,125
| style="text-align:right;"| 25.73
| style="text-align:right;"| -1.90
|-
! style="background-color:#FF0000" |
| style="width: 130px" | Popular Democratic Party (PPD)
|               | Miguel Reyes Dávila
| style="text-align:right;"|90,123
| style="text-align:right;"|21.85
| 
|-
! style="background-color:#FF0000" |
| style="width: 130px" | Popular Democratic Party (PPD)
|               | José Orlando Muñoz
|style="text-align:right;"| 89,939
|  style="text-align:right;"|21.80
| 
|-
! style="background-color:#01DF3A" |
| style="width: 130px" | Puerto Rican Independence Party (PIP)
|               | Víctor M. Caraballo
| style="text-align:right;"|6,494
|  style="text-align:right;"|1.57
| 
|-
! style="background-color:#01DF3A" |
| style="width: 130px" | Puerto Rican Independence Party (PIP)
|               | José A. Ojeda Santos
| style="text-align:right;"|5,806
|  style="text-align:right;"|1.41
| 
|-
! style="background-color:#008080" |
| style="width: 130px" | Movimiento Unión Soberanista (MUS)
|               | Carlos Alberto Velázquez
| style="text-align:right;"|2,598
| style="text-align:right;"| 0.63
| 
|-
! style="background-color:#800080" |
| style="width: 130px" | Worker's People Party of Puerto Rico (PPT)
|               | Ruth E. Arroyo Muñoz
| style="text-align:right;"|2,559
|  style="text-align:right;"|0.62
|

2008

|-
! style="background-color:#0080FF" |
| style="width: 130px" | New Progressive Party (PNP)
|               | Migdalia Padilla
|  style="text-align:right;"|122,265
|  style="text-align:right;"|28.04
| style="text-align:right;"| +1.58
|-
! style="background-color:#0080FF" |
| style="width: 130px" | New Progressive Party (PNP)
|               | Carmelo Ríos Santiago
|  style="text-align:right;"|120,462
|  style="text-align:right;"|27.63
| style="text-align:right;"| +1.57
|-
! style="background-color:#FF0000" |
| style="width: 130px" | Popular Democratic Party (PPD)
|               | Ivette Grajales
| style="text-align:right;"| 86,452
|  style="text-align:right;"|19.83
| 
|-
! style="background-color:#FF0000" |
| style="width: 130px" | Popular Democratic Party (PPD)
|               | Georgie Cases
|  style="text-align:right;"|85,526
|  style="text-align:right;"|19.62
| 
|-
! style="background-color:#FFBF00" |
| style="width: 130px" | Puerto Ricans for Puerto Rico Party (PPR)
|               | Angel R. De Jesús Ortega
|  style="text-align:right;"|7,984
|  style="text-align:right;"|1.83
| 
|-
! style="background-color:#01DF3A" |
| style="width: 130px" | Puerto Rican Independence Party (PIP)
|               | Gladys Rivera Rodríguez
|  style="text-align:right;"|5,633
|  style="text-align:right;"|1.29
| 
|-
! style="background-color:#01DF3A" |
| style="width: 130px" | Puerto Rican Independence Party (PIP)
|               | Benedicto Colón Pérez
| style="text-align:right;"| 5,601
|  style="text-align:right;"|1.28
|

2004

|-
! style="background-color:#0080FF" |
| style="width: 130px" | New Progressive Party (PNP)
|               | Migdalia Padilla
|  style="text-align:right;"|118,524
| style="text-align:right;"| 26.46
| style="text-align:right;"| +1.66
|-
! style="background-color:#0080FF" |
| style="width: 130px" | New Progressive Party (PNP)
|               | Carmelo Ríos Santiago
|  style="text-align:right;"|116,703
|  style="text-align:right;"|26.06
| 
|-
! style="background-color:#FF0000" |
| style="width: 130px" | Popular Democratic Party (PPD)
|               | Jorge Zapata
|  style="text-align:right;"|93,931
| style="text-align:right;"| 20.97
| 
|-
! style="background-color:#FF0000" |
| style="width: 130px" | Popular Democratic Party (PPD)
|               | Harry Aponte Rivera
|  style="text-align:right;"|93,028
|  style="text-align:right;"|20.77
| 
|-
! style="background-color:#01DF3A" |
| style="width: 130px" | Puerto Rican Independence Party (PIP)
|               | José E. Marrero
| style="text-align:right;"| 11,831
|  style="text-align:right;"|2.64
| 
|-
! style="background-color:#01DF3A" |
| style="width: 130px" | Puerto Rican Independence Party (PIP)
|               | Mario Maldonado Ramírez
|  style="text-align:right;"|11,768
|  style="text-align:right;"|2.63
|

References

External links
Distribución de Distritos Senatoriales de Puerto Rico

Puerto Rico Senatorial districts